Sam Pee Yalley is a Ghanaian lawyer and government official.

Educational life
He holds degrees form University of Ghana, Central University College and Ghana Institute of Management and Public Administration.

Political career
Yalley served as the deputy chief executive officer of the National Pensions Regulatory Authority. He also served as the authority's Acting Chief Executive Officer till 2014 till he handed over to Laud Senanu.  In March 2014 it was announced that he had been nominated by President John Mahama for an ambassadorial appointment.

References

Living people
National Democratic Congress (Ghana) politicians
21st-century Ghanaian lawyers
Ghanaian civil servants
Year of birth missing (living people)